Partido Nacional is Spanish for "National Party". Used as a proper noun without any other adjectives, it may refer to:

 National Party (Chile, 1857–1933)
 National Party (Chile, 1966–1973)
 National Party of Honduras
 National Party (Peru)
 National Party (Uruguay)